San Michele Tiorre, also known as Tiorre, is an Italian village and the major hamlet (frazione) of Felino, a municipality in the province of Parma, Emilia-Romagna. As of 2009 its population was of 1,495.

History
The village, first mentioned in a parchment of 1092, grew around the castle of Tiorre, located on a hill and nowadays in ruins. Part of Felino from 1806, year of establishment of the municipality, San Michele Tiorre grew urbanistically in last decades of the 20th century, increasing the population.

Geography
San Michele is located 17 km in south of Parma, in the middle of a plain between the rivers Baganza and Parma, close to Cinghio creek and below the Northern Apennines. Nearest settlements are the villages of Ca' Cotti, Parigi, La Resga, Pilastro (2 km east, in the comune of Langhirano), and Felino (1.7 km west).

The industrial (north) and the residential (south) areas are separated by the provincial highway SP32, that crosses the village in the middle. Another highway serving San Michele di Tiorre is the SP 665R/var.

Demographics

See also
Parigi (Felino)

References

External links

 San Michele Tiorre official website
San Michele Tiorre map (Tuttocittà)

Frazioni of the Province of Parma